Otto-Georg Moosdorf is a German violinist and conductor.

For many years, Moosdorf was a member of the Gewandhaus Leipzig. In 1971, he finally founded the "Leipziger Kammerorchester", consisting of musicians of the Leipzig Gewandhaus, and was thereupon for many years the leader of the orchestra.

In 2006, he also co-founded the chamber orchestra "Capella Via Regia", of which he was an honorary mentor until 2013.

The cellist Matthias Moosdorf is his son.

References

External links 
 

German classical violinists
German male conductors (music)
Date of birth missing (living people)
Living people
Place of birth missing (living people)
Year of birth missing (living people)